Acontia coquillettii is a species of bird dropping moth in the family Noctuidae. It is found in North America.

The MONA or Hodges number for Acontia coquillettii is 9163.

Description 
The A. coquillettii is a pure white moth, with a FW length of 9-10mm, with grey and olive markings on the distal forewing. The hindwing is grey with a light fringe (the hairs that border the wing). Its markings closely resemble its relative, Enterpia laudeti.

Distribution and habitat 
The A. coquillettii is found near the Snake River in Malheur County, Oregon, as well as much of California.

Behavior 
Like other moths, the species A. coquillettii is nocturnal and attracted to lights.

References

Further reading

 
 
 
 

coquillettii
Articles created by Qbugbot
Moths described in 1900